Rosemary Batt is the Alice Hanson Cook Professor of Women and Work at the Cornell University School of Industrial and Labor Relations (ILR) and a Professor in Human Resource Studies and International and Comparative Labor. Along with Lawrence M. Kahn, Batt is the co-editor-in-chief of Industrial and Labor Relations Review.

Education
Ph.D.  1996, MIT Sloan School of Management
M.A.   1981, Anthropology, University of Kentucky, Lexington, Kentucky
B.A.   1973, History, Cornell University

Publications
Eileen Appelbaum, Rosemary Batt. 2014. Private Equity at Work: When Wall Street Manages Main Street. NY, NY, United States: Russell Sage Foundation, 2014.
Rosemary Batt, Stephen Ackroyd, Paul Thompson, Pamela Tolbert. 2004. Oxford Handbook of Work and Organization. Oxford, UK, United Kingdom: Oxford University Press, 2004.
Eileen Appelbaum, Rosemary Batt. 1994. The New American Workplace: Transforming Work Systems in the US. Ithaca, NY, United States: Cornell ILR Press. Third Printing, 1994.

References

External links

Year of birth missing (living people)
Living people
Cornell University School of Industrial and Labor Relations faculty
MIT Sloan School of Management alumni
University of Kentucky alumni
Academic journal editors
Cornell University alumni
American women social scientists
21st-century American women